Michael L. Rankin (born August 7, 1946) is a senior judge on the Superior Court of the District of Columbia.

Education and career 
Rankin earned his Bachelor of Arts from Lincoln University in 1967 and his Juris Doctor from Howard University School of Law in 1970.

D.C. Superior Court 
President Ronald Reagan nominated Rankin on November 13, 1985, to a 15-year term as an associate judge on the Superior Court of the District of Columbia to the seat vacated by Nicholas S. Nunzio. On December 9, 1985, the Senate Committee on Homeland Security and Governmental Affairs held a hearing on his nomination. On December 12, 1985, the Committee reported his nomination favorably to the senate floor. On December 16, 1985, the full Senate confirmed his nomination by voice vote.

In 2000, and again in 2015, the Commission on Judicial Disabilities and Tenure recommended that he be reinstated for another fifteen year term as judge. He took senior status on August 31, 2019.

Personal life 
Rankin is married to fellow D.C. Superior Court judge Zinora Mitchell-Rankin and they have four children.

References

1946 births
Living people
20th-century American judges
20th-century American lawyers
21st-century American judges
Howard University School of Law alumni
Judges of the Superior Court of the District of Columbia
Lincoln University (Missouri) alumni
People from Memphis, Tennessee